The Canadian Intercollegiate Sailing Association (CICSA) is the governing authority for sailing competition at colleges and universities in Canada.

Intercollegiate sailing in Canada dates back to 1937. The organization founded by Lt.-Col. L.F. Grant, was known as C.I.D.R.A at the time. CICSA in its current form came into existence on October 16, 2010, with the help of Landon Gardner.

Teams
22 schools are registered with CICSA

References

External links
Official website
CICSA bylaws

College sailing in Canada
College sports governing bodies in Canada
Yachting associations in Canada
Sailing governing bodies